The Game Preservation Society is a non-profit organization dedicated to the preservation of Japanese computer games.

References

External links 

 

Non-profit organizations based in Japan
Video game organizations